The 2009 season was Lillestrøm SK's 19th season in the Tippeligaen, and their 34th consecutive season in the top division of Norwegian football.

Pre-season and friendlies
The first pre-season friendly is scheduled on January 15 vs Nybergsund IL.

References 

Lillestrøm SK seasons
Lillestrom